Magerman is a surname. Notable people with the surname include:

David Magerman (born 1968), American computer scientist and philanthropist
Frank Magerman (born 1977), Belgian footballer and manager
Gezelle Magerman (born 1997), South African hurdler

Dutch-language surnames